Three Rivers is an unincorporated community in Otero County, New Mexico, United States. Its elevation is 4,570 feet (1,393 m).

Notable people
Virginia Klinekole, first female president of the Mescalero Apache, 1959
Sara Misquez, president of the Mescalero Apache

References

Unincorporated communities in Otero County, New Mexico
Unincorporated communities in New Mexico